Michel Louis Edmond Galabru (27 October 19224 January 2016) was a French actor.

Career

Galabru appeared in more than 250 films and worked with directors such as Bertrand Blier, Costa-Gavras, Luc Besson (for Subway), and Jean-Luc Godard. 

He is also well known for his collaborations with Louis de Funès in Le gendarme de Saint-Tropez, Le gendarme se marie, Le gendarme et les extra-terrestres, Le gendarme en balade, Le gendarme à New York, Le gendarme et les gendarmettes, Le petit baigneur, L'avare,  Jo (film) and Nous irons a Deauville (with Michel Serrault).

He worked with the actors Ugo Tognazzi and Michel Serrault in La Cage aux Folles, La Cage aux Folles II, and La Cage aux Folles 3: The Wedding; and Le viager.

Selected filmography

Awards

In 1977, Galabru received a César for Best Actor for his portrayal of Joseph Bouvier in Bertrand Tavernier's The Judge and the Assassin.

References

External links

 

20th-century French male actors
21st-century French male actors
1922 births
2016 deaths
French National Academy of Dramatic Arts alumni
Best Actor César Award winners
French male film actors
French male stage actors
French male television actors
People from Safi, Morocco
Troupe of the Comédie-Française
Burials at Montmartre Cemetery